Tingwall Airport , also known as Lerwick/Tingwall Airport, is located in the Tingwall valley, near the village of Gott,  northwest of Lerwick in Mainland, Shetland, Scotland. Although it is the nearest airport to Lerwick, it is not Shetland's main airport, which is at Sumburgh. It is the one most used for inter-island flights within Shetland.

Tingwall Aerodrome has a CAA Ordinary Licence (Number P614) that allows flights for the public transport of passengers or for flying instruction as authorised by the licensee (Shetland Islands Council).

It was opened in 1976.

Airline and destinations

Statistics

Accidents and incidents
In 1996, an air ambulance lost altitude while turning to final approach for Runway 2 in strong and gusting winds, crashing 1.5 km short of the runway. The pilot was killed, and the doctor and nurse in the passenger cabin were injured. (Their patient had already been delivered to Inverness.) Lack of adequate ground lighting or other visual cues during the nighttime approach was a factor.

References

External links
Shetland Islands Council – Local Air services 
Airtask – company contracted to operate inter-island flights in Shetland

Airports in Shetland
Mainland, Shetland